was a Japanese aircraft manufacturer during World War II.

History
The company was founded as Kawanishi Engineering Works in 1920 in Hyōgo Prefecture as an outgrowth of the Kawanishi conglomerate, which had been funding the Nakajima Aircraft Company. Kawanishi built its first aircraft, the Kawanishi K-1 Mail-carrying Aircraft in 1921, and set up an airline, Nippon Koku K.K. (Japan Aviation Co. Ltd) in 1923, designing and building several aircraft for the airline's use. It was forced by the Japanese government to shut down Nippon Koku in 1929, however, with its routes being transferred to the government-owned Nippon Koku Yuso K.K. (Japan Air Transport Co. Ltd.) Kawanishi then split off the former Kawanishi Engineering Works, forming Kawanishi Kokuki KK in 1928, taking all of the Kawanishi Engineering Works' assets.

While Kawanishi was best known for its seaplanes, such as the Kawanishi H6K and H8K flying boats, its N1K-J land-based fighter -derived from their Kawanishi N1K1 floatplane fighter- was considered one of the best in the war. After Japan's defeat, the company was reborn as Shin Meiwa Industries (later ShinMaywa), and continued to create flying boats such as the PS-1 and US-2.

Products

Floatplanes
 E5K - 1931 three-seat reconnaissance floatplane, Kawanishi-built version of Yokosuka E5Y; 20 built
 E7K - 'Alf' 1933 three-seat reconnaissance floatplane; 533 built
 E8K - reconnaissance floatplane; lost to the Nakajima E8N
 E10K - 1934 night reconnaissance/transport flying boat; one built, but cancelled in favor of the Aichi E10A; prototype converted into a transport
 E11K - 1937 night reconnaissance flying boat; two built, but cancelled in favor of the Aichi E11A
 E12K
 E13K - 1938 three-seat reconnaissance floatplane; two built, but cancelled in favor of the Aichi E13A
 E15K  - 'Norm' 1941 reconnaissance floatplane; 15 built

Bombers
 G9K Gunzan - proposed land-based heavy bomber based on the H8K, remained a project
 K-100 - twin-engine land-based bomber project
 TB - four-engine heavy bomber project

Flying boats
 H3K - 1930 patrol/training flying boat; 5 built
 H6K - 'Mavis' 1936 patrol flying boat developed from the H3K; 215 built
 H8K - 'Emily' 1941 patrol flying boat; 167 built
 H11K Soukuu (Blue Sky) - transport flying boat project; mockup only
 K-60 - long-range 80 ton flying boat project
 K-200 - proposed turbojet-powered long-range flying boat, not built
 KX-3 - 500 ton, 12 engine flying boat project

Fighters
 K-11 - 1927 carrier-based fighter
 J3K - interceptor fighter, not built
 J6K Jinpu (Squall) - interceptor fighter; mockup only
 N1K Kyōfū (Gale) - 'Rex' 1942 floatplane fighter
 N1K1-J Shiden (Violet Lightning) - 'George' 1942 land-based fighter conversion of N1K 
 N1K2-J Shiden-KAI (Violet Lightning-modified) - 1943 improved N1K1-J

Trainers
 K6K - 1938 floatplane trainer prototype; 2 built
 K8K - 1938 floatplane trainer; 15 built

Transports
H6K2-L/H6K4-L - unarmed transport conversions of H6K
H8K1-L/H8K2-L/H8K4-L Seikū (Clear Sky) - transport conversions of H8K; H8K4-L remained a project as all H8K4s were lost in 1945
H11K1-L - projected transport version of H11K

Suicide attack aircraft
 Baika (Plum Blossom) - projected kamikaze aircraft based on the Fieseler Fi 103R, not built

Civil aircraft
 K-1 - 1920 mail plane
 K-2 - 1921 single-seat racer
 K-3 - 1921 multipurpose transport aircraft developed from the K-1
 K-5 - 1922 floatplane mail plane
 K-6 - 1923 three-seat biplane airliner
 K-7A Transport Seaplane - 1925 six-seat biplane floatplane airliner
 K-7B Mail-carrying Aircraft - mail plane modification of K-7A
 K-8 Transport Seaplane - 1926 floatplane mail plane
 K-9 - cargo aircraft project
 K-10 Transport - 1926 mail plane/six-seat airliner 
 K-12 Sakura - 1928 experimental long-range record-breaking aircraft

References

Notes

Bibliography

  (new edition 1987 by Putnam Aeronautical Books, .)
 
 
 Mikesh, Robert C. and Shorzoe Abe. Japanese Aircraft, 1910–1941. London: Putnam & Company Ltd., 1990. .
 Richards, M.C. "Kawanishi 4-Motor Flying-Boats (H6K 'Mavis' and H8K 'Emily')". Aircraft in Profile Volume 11. Windsor, Berkshire, UK: Profile Publications Ltd., 1972.

External links

 Corporate History of ShinMaywa at shinmaywa.co.jp

Companies based in Hyōgo Prefecture
Defunct aircraft manufacturers of Japan